Democrats for Nixon was a campaign to promote Democratic support for the then-incumbent Republican President Richard Nixon in the 1972 presidential election. The campaign was led by the former Democratic governor of Texas, John Connally. Connally, who was serving as the United States Secretary of the Treasury, announced that he would be supporting Nixon for re-election and would spend his time until the elections working on behalf of the incumbent.

A Democrat who had been Governor of Texas and United States Secretary of the Navy under John F. Kennedy, Connally formally announced the formation of the organization in August 1972. Polling cited by Connally indicated that as many as 20 million Democrats would cross over to vote for Nixon and invited "all those millions of Democrats who realize that in this Presidential election President Nixon is simply the better choice". Connally stated that he was troubled by Senator George McGovern's campaign and felt that the Democratic party "is becoming an ideological machine closed to millions who have been the party's most loyal and steadfast members" under McGovern's leadership. The committee included Mayor Beverly Briley of Nashville, Tennessee; former Governor of Florida Farris Bryant; Mayor of Boston John F. Collins; Mayor Thomas G. Dunn of Elizabeth, New Jersey; Teamsters president Frank Fitzsimmons; Governor of Virginia Mills E. Godwin, Jr.; Mayor of Miami, Florida David T. Kennedy; and former head of the United States Information Agency Leonard Marks. A fundraising target of as much as $3 million was set for the organization. Connally also announced that Jeno Paulucci, a frozen food distributor who had been closely involved as a fundraiser for Hubert H. Humphrey in his presidential bids, would serve as head of a group encouraging independent voters to choose Nixon.

In a September 1972 article in The New York Times, Connally was quoted as saying that increasing numbers of traditionally Democratic voters were leaving the fold because they "are afraid of George McGovern" because of his proposals for major cutbacks in defense spending and in the number of U.S. troops serving in Europe. Connally insisted that "it is in the best interests of this country that the president be re-elected this year".

See also
Reagan Democrat

References

1972 United States presidential election
Richard Nixon
Defunct American political movements
Factions in the Democratic Party (United States)